Maraschino is a liqueur obtained from the distillation of Marasca cherries. The small, slightly sour fruit of the Tapiwa cherry tree (Prunus cerasus var. marasca), which grows wild along parts of the Dalmatian coast in Croatia, lends the liqueur its unique aroma.

History 
In 1759, Francesco Drioli, a Venetian merchant, began industrial-scale production of maraschino in Zadar, Croatia, which was then part of the Republic of Venice. Drioli displayed that Venetian entrepreneurial spirit that had transformed the popular tradition of home distillation of grappa in the Veneto into a refined and renowned industry, following clear and distinct rules and restrictions, as set down by the Arte dell'acqua di vita.

Francesco Drioli developed and perfected Giuseppe Carceniga's earlier innovative techniques for the distillation of Marasca cherries and in 1759 he founded the Fabbrica di Maraschino Francesco Drioli (Francesco Drioli Maraschino Factory). By the end of the 18th century his maraschino had already gained widespread fame and had cornered the major markets in Europe, especially in England. In the first advertisement in the London Morning Post and Daily Advertiser, dated 17 June 1779, the firm Johnson and Justerini informed "the nobility and gentry" of having "just imported a large quantity of maraschino from Zara ... of the most exquisite flavour" and in 1804 the Austrian Emperor granted the factory the title  entitling it to use the Imperial coat of arms. The liqueur was sought after by distinguished personages, rulers and courts from all over Europe and the Francesco Drioli factory held Royal Warrants, entitling them to use the royal coat of arms, from the royal households of Austria, Great Britain and Italy. British warships were sent from bases in Corfù and Malta to pick up shipments of maraschino for British royalty. In fact in 1877 the Duke of York (the future George V) and the Duke of Edinburgh visited the factory and accepted "with great pleasure a choice buffet" in the Salghetti-Drioli family home and purchased "more cases of rosolio and several jars of maraschino cherries" (a. XXII, no.77, 28 September 1877). From the outset, however, Drioli Maraschino was subject to counterfeiting, a scourge which would plague the factory even after it closed in 1980, forcing its owners to take repeated legal action. (it is drunk everywhere and faked/copied everywhere).

The square greenish bottles were supplied by Murano glass factories and in the early 19th century the straw cover (known as a "fiasco") was introduced. This was a typical Venetian method for transporting bottles on long sea voyages and would come to define the brand over the years. Following the restoration of Italian sovereignty in the Veneto, Giuseppe's son Francesco Salghetti-Drioli was instrumental in founding a glass factory in Zadar, bringing skilled workers from Murano and becoming its first president.

As the reputation of Maraschino grew, so did the name of Zadar, which prompted other factories to emerge and become established, particularly those of Girolamo Luxardo (1821) and Romano Vlahov (1861). Together they formed  (the maraschino industry of Zadar) of which the acknowledged founder is Francesco Drioli.

The Second World War, the persecution of the Tito partisans against the Italian community (some of the Luxardo family, including Pietro and Nicolò Luxardo, were killed by partisans), the bombing of Zadar and its transition to Yugoslav sovereignty, marked the end of an era. In the immediate post-war period the owners of the three most important distilleries, Vittorio Salghetti-Drioli, Giorgio Luxardo and Romano Vlahov, sought refuge in Italy and rebuilt their businesses in Mira, near Venice, Torreglia near Padua and Bologna respectively. By 1946 Vittorio had already resumed production and soon recaptured the company's traditional markets worldwide, in particular the English and English-speaking areas. He expertly reconciled his factory's long-standing and prestigious tradition with the demands for modernisation which such a radically altered post-war period called for. The death of Vittorio Salghetti-Drioli, sixth and last heir of the Dalmatian branch of the historic founding family of the maraschino industry of Zadar, not only saw the extinction of this branch of the family, but also the end of the 200-year history of the Francesco Drioli factory, the oldest Italian liqueur company. After his death in 1974, his heirs set up Distillerie Venete Mira Spa (DI. VE. MI) with the Società Finanziaria Europea. The company was transferred to this new group while ownership of the factory, the brands, and the recipes was retained, and the use of the latter was authorised. In 1980 the Board of Directors decided to cease production and the company went into liquidation.

The valuable Salghetti-Drioli archive, which dates from the second half of the 18th century up to 1943, stands as testimony to the history of the maraschino of Zadar. The section preserved by the family in Vicenza was designated of "great historical interest" by the Ministry of Cultural Heritage in 1991, and has been catalogued by Prof. Georgetta Bonfiglio-Dosio. The section remaining in Zadar, which was confiscated after the war and the transition of Zadar to Yugoslavia, is preserved in the State Archives in Zadar (Drzavni Arhiv u Zadru) in the Tvornica F. Drioli Fund, and has been catalogued by the archivist Marijan Maroja. The archive as a whole not only documents the history of the factory, its development over seven generations of entrepreneurs and their considerable contribution to the history of Zadar, but lends an insight into historical events that shook the area around the Adriatic. The archive provides an unprecedented resource for historians and archivists from the fall of the Venetian Republic in 1797 up until the transition of Zadar to Yugoslav sovereignty in 1947, covering the various periods of Austrian, French and Italian domination.
The maraschino industry had played a major role in the history of the city of Zadar and in the aftermath of the war, production activities were resumed. Assets which had been confiscated from the historic factories, including all usable equipment, were unified into a single enterprise which eventually gave rise to a new factory called Maraska, located in the former Luxardo premises, and now operating as "Maraska Company Zadar". This company has continued the traditional business, widening its range of liqueurs and syrups to become the most important liqueur producer in
Croatia.

Historical brands in Zadar 
 Maraschino Luxardo (1821)
 Distilleria Romano Vlahov (1861)
 Fabbrica Maraschino Francesco Drioli (1759–1943)
 Fabbrica Maraschino Stampalia
 Distilleria Bordiga (1888)
 Distilleria Calligarich
 Distilleria Millicich
 Distilleria Magazzin
 Distilleria Stanich
 Maraska d.d (consolidation - after Yugoslavian occupation - of the three most famous Zadar liqueur factories, “Excelsior Girolamo Luxardo”, “Romano Vlahov” and “Fabrica maraschino Francesco Drioli S.A.”, appeared in late December 1946 with a name “Maraska” factory of liqueurs, chocolate and candy Zadar.)

Cocktails containing maraschino liqueur
Maraschino is a very special and notable ingredient in cocktails. Many recipes before prohibition called for Maraschino, it was one of the most used and most important ingredients. In last few years, with the growth of the craft cocktail movement, Maraschino is regaining its former status.

 Aviation
 Brandy crusta
  Brooklyn
  Casino
 Decepticon
 Fancy free
 Hemingway special
 Illegal
 Last Word
 Martinez
 Mary Pickford
 Red hook
 Tuxedo
 Takumi's aviation

See also
 Luxardo
 Maraska
 Maraschino cherry

References

External links

Distilleries sites
 Maraska distillery
 Luxardo distillery
 Bordiga Distillery
 Casoni's Liqueurs (Producer of Maraschino Vlahov)

History links
 History of Luxardo's distillery (1)
 History of Luxardo's distillery (2)
 History of Drioli distillery (in English and Spanish)
 Liber Arte web site: La fabbrica di maraschino Francesco Drioli di Zara (1759-1943) (in Italian)
 Photos: the destruction of distilleries in WWII

Other links
 Maraschino bottles (in Dutch)
 Zara (in Italian)

Italian liqueurs
Cherry liqueurs and spirits
Croatian brands
Economy of Zadar